JLA/The 99 is an American comic book limited series and intercompany crossover between DC Comics and Teshkeel Comics. The series chronicled a meeting between the superheroes of DC Comics' Justice League of America and Teshkeel Comics' The 99. It was written by Fabian Nicieza and Stuart Moore, and drawn by Tom Derenick.

Publication history
The initial idea for the crossover came about as a result of a friendship between The 99's creator, Naif Al-Mutawa and noted DC Comics writer and former publisher, Paul Levitz. The series ran for six issues, the first of which was released in October 2010.

Plot details
The plot of the series revolved around a worldwide threat that forces the members of The 99 and the Justice League to work together in order to save the planet.

The series took place within the established DC Universe, though it did not feature the members of writer James Robinson's contemporary Justice League, but rather a mix of characters from across the team's long history. Superman, Batman, Wonder Woman (sporting the costume from J. Michael Straczynski's revamp of her title), Hawkman, the John Stewart iteration of Green Lantern, the Barry Allen iteration of The Flash, the Ray Palmer iteration of The Atom, and the Jason Rusch/Ronnie Raymond iteration of Firestorm. Both Vixen and Doctor Light appeared as well, highlighting the multicultural and international aspect of the team.

The series also introduced a new member of The 99.

References

External links
 The 99 Official website

Comics by Fabian Nicieza
Intercompany crossovers